Nanette Duncan (born 9 July 1947) is an Australian former swimmer. She competed in three events at the 1964 Summer Olympics. Nanette grew up in Bankstown, she was coached by Don Talbot and attended the Presbyterian Ladies' College, Sydney.

References

External links
 

1947 births
Living people
Australian female backstroke swimmers
Australian female freestyle swimmers
Olympic swimmers of Australia
Swimmers at the 1964 Summer Olympics
Place of birth missing (living people)